Geçimli is a village in the Hozat District, Tunceli Province, Turkey. The village is populated by Kurds of the Abasan tribe and had a population of 83 in 2021.

The hamlets of Dikenli, Esenli and Meşeli are attached to the village.

References 

Kurdish settlements in Tunceli Province
Villages in Hozat District